The Riff was an Australian music video request television show that aired 6 days on Channel [V] hosted by Billy Russell, Danny Clayton, Carissa Walford and Marty Smiley. The show ran from 2013 to 2015.

See also

 List of Australian music television shows
WhatUwant

References

External links 
 

Channel V Australia original programming
Australian music chart television shows